Great Western Holdings was formed in December 1994 to bid for rail franchises in the United Kingdom during the Privatisation of British Rail.  Shares in the company were held by Richard George, Brian Scott and some other British Rail managers (51%), FirstBus (24.5%) and 3i (24.5%).

Great Western Holdings bid for a number of rail franchises winning the Great Western and the Regional Railways North West franchises in 1996 and 1997.

In March 1998, FirstGroup bought out its partners to give it 100% ownership.

References

FirstGroup railway companies
Holding companies of the United Kingdom
Post-privatisation British railway companies
1994 establishments in England
3i Group companies